The 2021 Kremlin Cup (also known as the 2021 VTB Kremlin Cup for sponsorship reasons) was a professional tennis tournament played on indoor hard courts. It was the 31st edition of the Kremlin Cup for the men and the 25th edition for the women. The tournament was part of the ATP 250 series of the 2021 ATP Tour, and of the WTA 500 series of the 2021 WTA Tour. It was held at the Irina Viner-Usmanova Gymnastics Palace and the Luzhniki Palace of Sports in Moscow, Russia, from 18 October through 24 October 2021.

Champions

Men's singles

  Aslan Karatsev def.  Marin Čilić, 6–2, 6–4

Women's singles

  Anett Kontaveit def.  Ekaterina Alexandrova, 4–6, 6–4, 7–5.

This was Kontaveit's 4th WTA title, and 3rd of the year.

Men's doubles

  Harri Heliövaara /  Matwé Middelkoop def.  Tomislav Brkić /  Nikola Ćaćić, 7–5, 4–6, [11–9]

Women's doubles

  Jeļena Ostapenko /  Kateřina Siniaková def.  Nadiia Kichenok /  Raluca Olaru, 6–2, 4–6, [10–8]

ATP singles main-draw entrants

Seeds

 Rankings are as of October 4, 2021

Other entrants
The following players received wildcards into the singles main draw:
  Evgeny Donskoy
  Alibek Kachmazov
  Roman Safiullin

The following players received entry using a protected ranking:
  Guido Pella
  Gilles Simon

The following players received entry from the qualifying draw:
  Damir Džumhur
  Egor Gerasimov
  Borna Gojo
  Illya Marchenko

The following player received entry as a lucky loser:
  Ričardas Berankis

Withdrawals
Before the tournament
  Pablo Andújar → replaced by  Federico Coria
  Ilya Ivashka → replaced by  Ričardas Berankis
  Sebastian Korda → replaced by  Gilles Simon
  Daniil Medvedev → replaced by  Mikael Ymer

ATP doubles main-draw entrants

Seeds 

1 Rankings are as of October 4, 2021

Other entrants 
The following pairs received wildcards into the doubles main draw:
  Aslan Karatsev /  Richard Muzaev 
  Pavel Kotov  /  Roman Safiullin

Withdrawals
Before the tournament
  Pablo Andújar /  Laslo Đere → replaced by  Laslo Đere /  Guido Pella
  Marcelo Arévalo /  Matwé Middelkoop → replaced by  Harri Heliövaara /  Matwé Middelkoop
  Marin Čilić /  Sebastian Korda → replaced by  Ilya Ivashka /  Pedro Martínez

WTA singles main-draw entrants

Seeds

 Rankings are as of October 4, 2021 .

Other entrants
The following players received wildcards into the singles main draw:
  Simona Halep
  Anett Kontaveit
  Anastasia Potapova
  Aryna Sabalenka

The following players received entry from the qualifying draw:
  Anna Kalinskaya
  Aleksandra Krunić
  Bernarda Pera
  Oksana Selekhmeteva
  Lesia Tsurenko
  Zheng Qinwen

The following player received entry as a lucky loser:
  Irina Bara

Withdrawals
Before the tournament
  Bianca Andreescu → replaced by  Anhelina Kalinina
  Paula Badosa → replaced by  Andrea Petkovic
  Belinda Bencic → replaced by  Dayana Yastremska
  Danielle Collins → replaced by  Markéta Vondroušová
  Angelique Kerber  → replaced by  Irina Bara
  Petra Martić → replaced by  Kateřina Siniaková
  Elise Mertens → replaced by  Liudmila Samsonova
  Emma Raducanu → replaced by  Tereza Martincová

WTA doubles main-draw entrants

Seeds 

1 Rankings are as of October 4, 2021

Other entrants 
The following pair received a wildcard into the doubles main draw:
  Oksana Selekhmeteva /  Anastasia Tikhonova

The following pair received entry using a protected ranking:
  Vera Lapko /  Lidziya Marozava

Withdrawals 
Before the tournament
  Sharon Fichman /  Giuliana Olmos → replaced by  Anna Kalinskaya /  Anastasia Potapova
  Veronika Kudermetova /  Elena Vesnina → replaced by  Natela Dzalamidze /  Kamilla Rakhimova
  Arina Rodionova /  Aliaksandra Sasnovich → replaced by  Anna Danilina /  Arina Rodionova
  Monica Niculescu /  Elena-Gabriela Ruse → replaced by  Vera Lapko /  Lidziya Marozava

References

External links
 

2021
Kremlin Cup
Kremlin Cup
Kremlin Cup
Kremlin Cup